Repeater is the full-length debut studio album by the American post-hardcore band Fugazi. It was released on April 19, 1990, as Repeater on LP, and in May 1990 on CD bundled with the 3 Songs EP as Repeater + 3 Songs. It was recorded at Inner Ear Studios in Arlington, Virginia, and produced and engineered by Don Zientara and Ted Niceley.

Repeater is often regarded as a definitive album for the band and a landmark of rock music. It has been described as an "angrier American update of Gang of Four's Solid Gold." It has also been noted for its complex interplay of guitar and rhythm section. It is included in the book 1000 Recordings to Hear Before You Die.

Background
By 1989 Fugazi had made the transition into jamming on and writing new material as a band as opposed to playing songs composed solely by singer/guitarist Ian MacKaye. After the completion of several lengthy U.S. and European tours, they began to work on new material as well as refining songs that they had already been performing live, such as "Merchandise" and "Turnover", the latter of which was originally titled "NSA" in its original form, featuring MacKaye on vocals.

The band once again chose to work with both Don Zientara and Ted Niceley as they had previously, and entered Inner Ear Studios in July 1989 to begin the recording process. The group was only able to record with Niceley present between the hours of 9 a.m. and 1 p.m. because Niceley was splitting his time between the studio and culinary school. Recording for the album was completed in September 1989.

The album cover was based on a photo by Jim Saah.

The album's subject matter addresses a wide variety of themes such as greed, violence, sexuality, privacy, drug abuse and death. MacKaye told Guitar World that the album title "is loaded on so many levels. It's actually about how things in life repeat over and over. But the title is also a rather obscure nod to The Beatles' Revolver. A record revolves and it also repeats. A revolver is also a gun, and so is a repeater. The title track is about kids repeatedly shooting each other and references the crack cocaine-related violence in Washington, D.C. in the 1980s."

Release and reception

Released on April 19, 1990, through Dischord Records, Repeater did not initially reach the Billboard 200 charts or become a commercial success. However, the band spent most of 1990 and 1991 touring heavily, performing a total of 250 concerts between March 1990 and June 1991, routinely selling out 1,000+ capacity venues all over the world.

While major labels began to court Fugazi, the band decided that Dischord was distributing their records well enough and refused the offers. According to Alan O'Connor in his 2008 book Punk Record Labels and the Struggle for Autonomy: The Emergence of DIY, Repeater went on to sell 500,000 copies (based on an interview with Dischord Records). The album was also critically well received.

Legacy

Influence 
Repeater featured an alternative rock sound that predated significant releases such as Nirvana's Nevermind and Pearl Jam's Ten, which would unexpectedly go on to break the genre into the mainstream. Tim Commerford of Rage Against the Machine was influenced by the album, as were Steve Holmes of American Football and Metz. Ben Weinman of The Dillinger Escape Plan named it one of his favorite records of all time.

La Dispute covered the title track live. The track "Merchandise" has been covered by Face to Face (on their album Standards & Practices), Ted Leo and the Pharmacists and Dogstar. "Blueprint" was covered by Gogol Bordello live, Ben Lee and Tim Timebomb. The track was quoted by The Knife on the track "Raging Lung" off of Shaking the Habitual. It has also been sampled by Emynd for Stranger Day's track "Not Playin'". "Styrofoam" has been covered by Stereotyperider. "Shut the Door" has been covered by Boy Eats Drum Machine.

Accolades 
As of October 2022, aggregator website Acclaimed Music finds the album to be the 652nd most acclaimed album of all time.

Track listing

Personnel
Fugazi
Brendan Canty – drums
Joe Lally – bass
Ian MacKaye – guitar, piano, vocals
Guy Picciotto – guitar, vocals

Technical personnel
Ted Niceley – producer
Don Zientara – engineer

Album Cover
Jim Saah – Photo
Kurt Sayenga - Design

See also 
 Repeater (disambiguation)

References

External links

Repeater (Adobe Flash) at Radio3Net (streamed copy where licensed)

Fugazi albums
1990 debut albums
Albums produced by Ted Niceley
Dischord Records albums
Albums produced by Ian MacKaye
Post-hardcore albums by American artists